Bill Coffin (born September 17, 1970) is a writer of novels and role-playing games in the fantasy and science fiction genres. Perhaps best known for his work at Palladium Books from July 1998 through May 2002, he made significant contributions to several of Palladium's game series, most notably Palladium Fantasy, but also Heroes Unlimited and Rifts, and created his own game, Systems Failure.

Career
Bill Coffin is a well-received author who made many books for Palladium Books from 1988 through 2002. He was a contributor to both the Palladium Fantasy Role-Playing and Rifts role-playing games.  In his post-apocalyptic role-playing game Systems Failure (1999), Y2K really happened. However, due to a conflict with Kevin Siembieda, the president and co-founder of Palladium Books, Coffin left the company, much to the disappointment of his fans. Siembieda wound up firing Coffin over editorial differences and discontent against the Rifts Coalition Wars (which the two had co-authored). At the time of his departure, Coffin was the lead author of six titles in the final stages of production. He was subsequently demoted to second- and third-author status on two of these books prior to their release, and the other four were ultimately shelved and have not been rescheduled for publication. In addition, having only received limited support from Palladium, Systems Failure has since gone out of print.

In March 2007, it was revealed that Coffin was working on Septimus, a new campaign setting for the D6 Space core book for West End Games. However, due to financial concerns, the publisher cancelled the project in March 2008. Shortly thereafter, Coffin declared that he would release the game as a PDF under Evil Hat Productions' FATE system. In May 2009, West End Games announced that they had agreed to publish Septimus again and that it would be released August 2009. Eric Gibson released Bill Coffin's Septimus in 2009 as a PDF, which became the last product released by West End Games. He is currently working on The Dark Britania Saga and will have the third and final book out hopefully before 2014.

Bibliography

Palladium Books

Heroes Unlimited 
  – Editor.
 
 
  – Additional text and concepts.

Palladium Fantasy Role-Playing Game 
  – Lead author, maps.
  – Lead author, maps.
  – Lead author, maps.
  – Lead author, maps.
  – Coauthor, maps.
  – Lead author, maps.
  – Coauthor.

Rifts 
  – Additional text and concepts.
  – Additional text and concepts.
  – Additional text and ideas.
  – Coauthor.
  – Additional text and ideas.
  – Additional text and ideas.
  – Additional text and ideas.
  – Compiling, additional text and ideas, selected material.
  – Compiling.
  – Additional text and "words of wisdom".
  – Some compilation and additional text, selected material.
 
  – Additional text and ideas.
  – Additional text and ideas.

Systems Failure 
  [Out of Print] – Lead author, maps.

The Rifter 
  [Out of Print]
  [Out of Print]
  [Out of Print]
  [Out of Print] – Authored as "Peter Ferkelberger".
  [Out of Print]

West End Games

Novels

Notes

External links 
List of works at RPGnet game index
Author profile at Reliquary Press
Author profile and articles at National Underwriter Life & Health
Bill Coffin: A novelist's blog and everything that goes with it

1970 births
American business and financial journalists
American male journalists
American fantasy writers
American magazine editors
20th-century American novelists
American science fiction writers
Living people
Megaverse (Palladium Books)
Writers from Easton, Pennsylvania
Role-playing game designers
Washington and Lee University alumni
21st-century American novelists
American male novelists
Novelists from Pennsylvania
21st-century American non-fiction writers
20th-century American male writers
21st-century American male writers